In mathematics, discrepancy theory describes the deviation of a situation from the state one would like it to be in. It is also called the theory of irregularities of distribution. This refers to the theme of classical discrepancy theory, namely distributing points in some space such that they are evenly distributed with respect to some (mostly geometrically defined) subsets. The discrepancy (irregularity) measures how far a given distribution deviates from an ideal one.

Discrepancy theory can be described as the study of inevitable irregularities of distributions, in measure-theoretic and combinatorial settings. Just as Ramsey theory elucidates the impossibility of total disorder, discrepancy theory studies the deviations from total uniformity.

A significant event in the history of discrepancy theory was the 1916 paper of Weyl on the uniform distribution of sequences in the unit interval.

Theorems 
Discrepancy theory is based on the following classic theorems:
 The theorem of van Aardenne–Ehrenfest
 Axis-parallel rectangles in the plane (Roth, Schmidt)
 Discrepancy of half-planes (Alexander, Matoušek)
 Arithmetic progressions (Roth, Sarkozy, Beck, Matousek & Spencer)
 Beck–Fiala theorem
 Six Standard Deviations Suffice (Spencer)

Major open problems 
The unsolved problems relating to discrepancy theory include:
 Axis-parallel rectangles in dimensions three and higher (folklore)
 Komlós conjecture 
 Heilbronn triangle problem on the minimum area of a triangle determined by three points from an n-point set

Applications 
Applications for discrepancy theory include:
 Numerical integration: Monte Carlo methods in high dimensions.
 Computational geometry: Divide-and-conquer algorithm.
 Image processing: Halftoning
 Random trial formulation: Randomized controlled trial

See also 
Discrepancy of hypergraphs

References

Further reading

Diophantine approximation
Unsolved problems in mathematics
Discrepancy theory
Measure theory